is a Japanese jidaigeki or period television drama. It is the tenth in the Hissatsu series.  The drama is a sequel to Hissatsu Shiokinin. Shin Hissatsu Shiokinin is one of the most popular Jidaigeki dramas in Japan. Former professional Baseball player Fumio Fujimura made his first appearance as an actor.

Plot
In the final episode of Hissatsu Shiokinin, Nenbutsu no Tetsu left Edo but he returned and became a member of Tora no kai.

One day he is surprised that Nakamura Mondo's name was mentioned and that he was targeted for murder in Tora no kai. Tetsu breaks the rule of Tora no kai and helps Mondo. Tetsu and Mondo reunite for the first time in four years. They start killing villains again under the rule of Tora no Kai.

Cast

Shiokinin group 
 Makoto Fujita: Nakamura Mondo  is a dōshin(Policeman of edo period) but he is also professional killer who takes charge of killing bad people with money. He hides his master level sword skills under a mask of incompetence and buffoonery.
 Tsutomu Yamazaki: Nenbutsu no Tetsu is a former monk but now he is a chiropractor, but he is also a professional killer. He uses his extremely tough fingers to dislocate the ribs of his targets. In some episodes he uses his skills as a chiropractor to cripple targets.
 Katsuo Nakamura: Miyomatsu is a tinker but he is also aprofessional killer.
 Shōhei Hino: Shōuhachi. He returns in Edo Professional Hissatsu Shōbainin.
 Mie Nakao: Otei

Tora no kai 
 Fumio Fujimura: Motojime Tora, Tora is boss of Tora no Kai. He seldom kills villains by himself but sometimes he does. He uses baseball bat to kill villains. 
 Kenzo Kawarazaki: Shinigami, Motojime Tora's subordinate

Mondo's family 
 Kin Sugai: Nakamura Sen
 Mari Shiraki: Nakamura Ritsu

Directors
Eiichi Kudo Episode1,2,5,19,27,36,39
Youichi Harada Episode34,38,41

See also
 Hissatsu Shikakenin  (First in the Hissatsu series)
 Hissatsu Shiokinin (2nd in the Hissatsu series)
 Tasukenin Hashiru  (3rd in the Hissatsu series)
 Hissatsu Shiokiya Kagyō  (6th in the Hissatsu series)

References

1977 Japanese television series debuts
1977 Japanese television series endings
Jidaigeki television series